Dan Damon is a BBC journalist and radio broadcaster who presented World Update for the BBC World Service.

Early career
Damon joined the BBC in 1974 as a technical operator for radio news.  His move into journalism took place in 1982 with a nightly phone in on LBC.  Damon, with his wife Sian, spent seven years filming the downfall of the Soviet Union throughout Eastern Europe.  He then returned to the BBC to work as a presenter and reporter for BBC World Service and BBC Radio 4.  During this time he was a regular presenter of PM.

World Update 
In 2003 Damon became the main presenter of World Update on the BBC World Service. He presented the programme on weekdays at 1000 UK Time. He presented the programme from locations around the world.

References

BBC newsreaders and journalists
BBC World Service people
British radio presenters
Living people
Year of birth missing (living people)